The 23rd Arabian Gulf Cup was the 23rd edition of the biennial football competition for the eight members of the Arab Gulf Cup Football Federation. It took place in Kuwait from 22 December 2017 until 5 January 2018. Oman won their second title, defeating the United Arab Emirates in the final on penalties following a goalless draw.

This tournament has the fewest goals-per-game average (1.53) in the history of Arabian Gulf Cup tournaments.

Hosting 
The Gulf Cup tournament was originally scheduled to be in 2016.  It was delayed to 2017 after Kuwait was suspended by FIFA, and the tournament was moved to Qatar.

The tournament was originally scheduled to be held in Basra, Iraq, with an official decision set to be made in February 2015. On 2 February 2015, the Iraqi Ministry of Youth announced that Iraq would not host the competition due to a financial crisis in Iraq, but hoped to host the next edition in 2018. It would have been the second time that Iraq had hosted this competition after 1979 which was held in the capital Baghdad. Iraq was set to organize the two previous editions in 2013 and 2014, but the tournament shifted each time, after concerns over preparations and security. Instead, it was moved to Kuwait to be the hosts for the fourth time, after the editions of 1974, 1990 and 2003.

On 3 July 2015, it was announced that the awarding of hosting rights to Kuwait was postponed after reviewing the technical reports, and that a further announcement would be made later that month. The dates of the competition were also slightly changed to take place from 22 December 2015 to 4 January 2016. Again, on 3 August 2015, the dates of the championship were pushed back to December 2016 or January 2017 due to infrastructure problems in Kuwait, but Kuwait would remain the hosts of the competition. This again was changed in late August, when Kuwait announced that they would host as initially agreed in December 2015, that was after most domestic leagues in the region had re-arranged their calendars due to the earlier postponement.

On 19 October 2015, Kuwait withdrew from hosting following Kuwait Football Association's suspension from FIFA.  Kuwait were to be once again re-instated as hosts on 27 April 2016, if their suspension by FIFA was lifted by May 2016, failing this, the tournament would be hosted by Qatar in December 2017. The suspension was not lifted at the 66th FIFA Congress and therefore, as decided from the earlier announcement on 27 April, the tournament would be moved to Qatar to be played in December 2017.

Concerns were later raised on Qatar's hosting of the event due to the Qatar diplomatic crisis, although no official announcement has been made by 11 September 2017. In November 2017, Saudi Arabia, the United Arab Emirates, and Bahrain pulled out of the Gulf Cup. On 6 December 2017, after Kuwait's adoption of a new sports law, Kuwait FA's FIFA suspension was lifted. On 7 December 2017, it was announced that Kuwait will again host the tournament after Saudi Arabia, the UAE, and Bahrain threatened to withdraw because of the said diplomatic crisis.

Teams

Venues

Squads

Group stage 

All times are local (UTC+03:00).

Group A

Group B

Knockout stage 

All times are local (UTC+03:00).

Semi-finals

Final

Winner

Goalscorers 

2 goals

 Jamal Rashid
 Ali Faez
 Ali Husni
 Said Al-Ruzaiqi
 Almoez Ali

1 goal

 Ali Madan
 Mahdi Kamil
 Mohannad Abdul-Raheem
 Mukhtar Fallatah
 Salman Al-Moasher
 Abdullah Al Buraiki
 Ahmed Kano
 Akram Afif
 Hassan Al-Haydos
 Al-Mahdi Ali Mukhtar
 Ró-Ró
 Ali Mabkhout

1 own goal

 Mahdi Abduljabbar

Awards 
The following awards were given:

Team statistics 
This table shows all team performance.

Media

Broadcasting

References

External links 
 Official site

 
Arabian Gulf Cup
Arabian Gulf Cup
2017
Arabian Gulf Cup
2017–18 in Kuwaiti football